Charles Desvergnes (1860–1928) was a French sculptor.

His life and achievements

Desvergnes was born in Bellegarde in Loiret, the son of a working-class family; his father was a baker. At his father's bakery, Desvergnes often used the dough to make models and his prowess came to the attention of the local Lord of the Manor, Charles Galopin, who introduced the young Desvergnes to the Paris sculptor Chapu.

By the age of 15, he had passed the entrance exams for the École des Beaux-Arts in Paris. The Conseil Général du Loiret and his home town financed his years as a student and he was to win several prizes whilst at the school. He was runner up for the Rome prize in 1887 and received the prize itself in 1889 for his high relief "Le Retour de l'enfant prodigue". He was subsequently accepted at the "Villa Médicis" in Rome and studied sculpture there for 5 years.

On his return to France he received some prestigious commissions for public monuments including a monument to the neurologist Dr Duchenne and in 1899 his "monument commémoratif du combat des Aydes au faubourg Bannier" was inaugurated in Orléans. His major break through came with a commission to work on the monument at Melun, another Franco-Prussian war memorial. For this he was to receive the "Legion d'Honneur".

It was his long collaboration with Marcel Marron in Orleans that was to ensure that Desvergnes' work had the maximum exposure. Over the years 1902 to 1912, Desvergnes designed and made statues depicting Joan of Arc and Marron made copies of these works and marketed them to churches throughout France. The statues were life size. Desvergnes also sculpted some busts of Joan of Arc and these were again marketed by Marron.

In the years after the end of the Great War, there was a huge demand in France for war memorials. The loss of life had been enormous and every city, town and village in France felt the need to honour those who had lost their lives. There was a strict line drawn in France between public war memorials and those to be erected in parish churches and other religious buildings so in many cases communities sought to have a public and a religious memorial.

Again Desvergnes worked with Marron and designed and sculpted several memorials which Marron was to copy and market.

Thus Desvergnes' bas-relief of an angel drawing the attention of a dying soldier to Jesus on the cross, his composition showing an angel about to crown a soldier and his composition showing a soldier resting his foot on a German helmet can be seen throughout France.

Desvergnes' final work was at Beauvais Cathedral and was a study of the Bishop of Beauvais, Le Senne, seeking a pardon from Joan of Arc. Sadly Desvergnes died before this work was completed and it was finished off by others.

Towards the end of his life, Desvergnes left a collection of his work to his home town of Bellegarde, where it can be seen at the Pavillon d'Antin.

Desvergnes' work can be put into the following categories.

Early works including submissions for the Prix de Rome

Early works. Public statues and monuments

Early works. Medallions, bas-relief portraits

There are several other Desvergnes medallions and bas-relief portraits held in the Nemours museum. These include studies of Leopoldo Taussig and U. Moreau, as well as a study entitled "Portrait d'homme" and another titled "Portrait de jeune femme".

Depictions of Joan of Arc (Jeanne d'Arc) and St Michael marketed by Marcel Marron

Through Marcel Marron, Desvergnes marketed several life-size models of Joan of Arc. The first was entitled "Sainte Jeanne d'Arc" and was catalogued as the "modéle universel". It was available in various sizes. In this work Joan has her hands clasped together, with one arm linked around a flag. She has a sword hanging from her right hip. Her hair is parted in the centre. The original work was carried out by Desvergnes in 1909. The next model dates to 1912 and is entitled "Jeanne d'Arc s'élevant a la Gloire Céleste". It was also marketed as the "modéle du Centenaire". It was available in five sizes. Here Desvergnes depicts Joan holding a flag in her right hand whilst her left hand is held up from her side. Here the sword hangs down from her waist and in front of her. She wears her hair in a fringe. The third model is known as the "Modéle de Trouville" and has the title "Jeanne d'Arc Triomphante". This was available in three sizes. Easy to distinguish from the earlier models as Jeanne wears a helmet. Again she holds the flag in her right hand whilst her left hand hangs away from her body. Her sword hangs from a belt and is on the left side. There was also a model of a winged St Michel after he had slain the dragon. He stands triumphant with left arm raised whilst his right hand rests on his sword. The dead dragon was depicted at his feet. Very often a church would choose a statue of St Jeanne and one of St Michel and display the two standing together. Marron also offered busts of St Jeanne by Desvergnes. In one she has her hair parted down the centre, in another she is helmeted and in a third she has her hair in a fringe. Interesting to note that each statue issued by Marron was given a unique and sequential number. In the case of the Beaugency statue which is mentioned below the unique number was 169.

Other depictions of Joan of Arc

Images Beauvais

Other work. Churches

Some of Desvergnes' monument aux morts are listed below as are details of his statues of Joan of Arc. It must be stressed that the list is not definitive.

The lists identify where monument aux morts were made and marketed through Masson, and have been recorded where possible by the model involved. Otherwise Desvergnes did work with other founders or other marketing arms and also produced the occasional monument aux mort independently. Again separate lists have been drawn up.

Monuments aux morts. Models marketed by Marcel Marron

Marcel Marron was a company based in Orleans who sold statues and memorials. They worked with Charles Desvergnes and their joint works, mostly bas-reliefs, and of a religious nature, can be seen throughout France. The most popular works were-"Ange de reconnaissance couronnant un poilu", "Le Divin modèle", "L'Héroïque poilu de France" and "Lauriers célestes". The composition of "Ange de reconnaissance couronnant un poilu" comprises an angel, a soldier and a central upright stone. Normally the names of the men remembered would be inscribed on this stone and sometimes an epitaph. The angel stands at the back of the upright stone. She has a sprig of laurel in her left hand and in her right hand she holds a crown. She holds this crown over the head of the soldier who stands to the right of the central upright. He stands with hands held together and legs crossed. In the "Le Divin modèle", we have a wounded or dying soldier being comforted by a winged angel. She is pointing to the figure of Christ on the cross which is behind them and which appears to be rising up from the trenches where we see soldiers carrying the wounded away from the front line. "L'Héroïque poilu de France" depicts a standing soldier who is resting his foot on the spiked helmet worn by German soldiers. It was this model which the Germans were to take exception to during the Second World War occupation and many such monuments were destroyed. The composition of "Lauriers célestes" was of three elements. In the centre Desvergnes depicted the crucified Christ and to the left an angel carrying some laurel. This and the panel to the left was an ornate composition with fruit, oak leaves and other foliage.

Monuments aux morts. Models marketed by Marcel Marron."Ange de reconnaissance couronnant un poilu"

This is by no means a complete list of all the copies of "Ange de reconnaissance couronnant un poilu" to be found in French churches

Monuments aux morts. Models marketed by Marcel Marron."Le Divin modèle"

A further church which features "Le Divin modèle" is the parish church at La Ferté-Loupière in Yonne. Again it should be stressed that this is not a definitive list of churches that hold the "Le Divin modèle".

Monuments aux morts. Models marketed by Marcel Marron."L'Héroïque poilu de France"

Monuments aux morts. Models marketed by Marcel Marron. "Lauriers célestes".

Other Desvergnes/Marron versions of monument aux morts

Monuments aux morts. Other models marketed by Marcel Marron."Grenadier" and others

Monuments aux morts. Models marketed by other founders

References

1860 births
1928 deaths
Prix de Rome for sculpture
20th-century French sculptors
19th-century French sculptors
French male sculptors
19th-century French male artists